9 de maio Airport  is the airport serving Teixeira de Freitas, Brazil.

History
Teixeira de Freitas—9 de Maio Airport is a regional airport, located in Teixeira de Freitas, south of the state of Bahia, Brazil. The airport serves locations in south Bahia, northeast of Minas Gerais and north of Espírito Santo. Through a government investment of about 23 million dollars in the end of 2014, the airport will be upgraded to a mid-size airport, estimated to serve around 300.000 passengers a year in 2025.

Airlines and destinations

Access

See also

List of airports in Brazil

References

External links

Airports in Bahia